John J. Brooks was an American lawman. He served as lieutenant in the service of the Arizona Rangers from 1904 to 1905.

References 

Year of birth missing
Date of death missing
Year of death missing
People from Texas
Arizona Rangers
People who faked their own death
Ranchers from Arizona
Ranchers from Texas
Members of the Texas Ranger Division